Top Cat is an animated television series that aired in the early 1960s that was produced by the Hanna-Barbera studios. 

Top Cat may also refer to:

 Top Cat and the Beverly Hills Cats, a 1988 film based on two episodes of the original series
 Top Cat: The Movie, a 2011 film based on the original series
 Top Cat Begins, a 2015 film based on the original series
 Top Cat (brand), a British brand of cat food
 Topcat, sailing catamaran boat class
 HSC Manannan catamaran ferry formerly 'TopCat' sailing between islands in New Zealand

See also
 Top Dog (disambiguation)